was a professional wrestling event promoted by DDT Pro-Wrestling (DDT). The full official name of the event could be translated as "Summer vacation! Ah! Summer vacation, summer vacation...". The event took place on July 25, 2010, in Tokyo at the Ryōgoku Kokugikan. The event featured nine matches, three of which were contested for championships. The event aired on Fighting TV Samurai and the dark match was broadcast on ustream.

Storylines
The Ryōgoku Peter Pan 2010 event featured nine professional wrestling matches that involved different wrestlers from pre-existing scripted feuds and storylines. Wrestlers portrayed villains, heroes, or less distinguishable characters in the scripted events that built tension and culminated in a wrestling match or series of matches.

By winning the KO-D Openweight Championship Contendership Tournament on May 30, Harashima earned a title match in the main event against KO-D Openweight Champion Daisuke Sekimoto.

Event
As in the previous year, Michael Nakazawa's anal blast was held as the opening ceremony. The amount of gunpowder was twice that of the previous year. Announcer Hidekazu Tanaka was the host of the ceremony and Masahiro Chono triggered the detonation.

In the dark match preceding the main card, Sanshiro Takagi and Munenori Sawa from Battlarts defended the KO-D Tag Team Championship in a Falls Count Anywhere match against the team of Jun Kasai and Kamui from Pro-Wrestling Freedoms. The match quickly spilled outside of the ring and all over the building.

On the main card, Mr. #6 teamed with Great Kojika from Big Japan Pro Wrestling and Riho from Ice Ribbon to unify their Sea of Japan 6-Person Tag Team Championship with the UWA World Trios Championship held by the team of Hikaru Sato, Keisuke Ishii and Yoshihiko, and the Jiyugaoka 6-Person Tag Team Championship held by the team of Kudo, Yasu Urano and Antonio Honda.

The gauntlet match saw the participation of Manabu Nakanishi from New Japan Pro-Wrestling who teamed with Poison Sawada Julie.

The next match involved Tajiri from the newly founded Smash promotion.

In the sixth match, Naomichi Marufuji from Pro Wrestling Noah was originally supposed to face Kota Ibushi, however, due to Ibushi suffering an injury before the show, his tag team partner Kenny Omega was named as his replacement. Because of this, Omega had to vacate the Sea of Japan 6-Person Tag Team Championship he was holding with Mr. #6 and Riho since June 13, and Great Kojika was declared champion on July 20 so that he could defend the title at Ryōgoku Peter Pan 2010.

Results

Gauntlet match

References

External links
The official DDT Pro-Wrestling website
Ryōgoku Peter Pan 2010 at ProWrestlingHistory.com

DDT Peter Pan
2010 in professional wrestling
July 2010 events in Japan
Professional wrestling in Tokyo
2010 in Tokyo
Events in Tokyo